This is a list of ministries of the Government of Australia since Federation in 1901.

Ministries

Notes 
1..Date of swearing in of Interium ministry. Full ministry to be sworn in 1st July 2022.
2..Election to occur in mid 2025

References